The Bengal Music College (BMC) is a music training college in Kolkata, India, established in 1940 by Nanigopal Bandopadhyay, the college is affiliated with the University of Calcutta since 1956. It offers intermediate, undergraduate (honours and general), and postgraduate degrees in Indian classical music.

The college started Master of Music course in 2003, and in 2009 it also started a Ph.D. program, also affiliated with the University of Calcutta.

See also

References

External links
 Official website

Universities and colleges in Kolkata
University of Calcutta affiliates
Educational institutions established in 1940
Music schools in India
1940 establishments in India